Zavar (also Romanized as Zavār) is a village in Anduhjerd Rural District, Shahdad District, Kerman County, Kerman Province, Iran. At the 2006 census, its population was 95, in 23 families.

References 

Populated places in Kerman County